Adinolepis is a genus of beetles in the family Cupedidae containing five species, all endemic to Australia.

Species 

 Adinolepis apodema
 Adinolepis eumana
 Adinolepis mathesonae
 Adinolepis youanga

Reclassified to another genus:

 Adinolepis scalena

References

Archostemata genera
Cupedidae